"Riviera Life" is the fifth single by Dutch jazz singer Caro Emerald from her debut album Deleted Scenes from the Cutting Room Floor. It was released on 15 April 2011 as a Digital download in the Netherlands. Written by David Schreurs and Vincent Degiorgio, the song is based on a scene in Hitchcock's 1955 movie To Catch A Thief.

Track listing 
Riviera Life - EP
 "Riviera Life" – 3:28
 "Close to Me / Riviera Life" (Live @ The Heineken Music Hall) - 5:40
 "Riviera Life" (Instrumental) - 3:30
 "Riviera Life" (Acapella) - 3:10

Chart performance

Weekly charts

Year-end charts

Release history

References 

2011 singles
English-language Dutch songs
Caro Emerald songs
Songs written by David Schreurs
2009 songs
Songs written by Vincent DeGiorgio